Retrospective: 1995–2005 is Natalie Merchant's first greatest hits album, featuring her most popular songs. It was released on 27 September 2005 on Elektra Records.

Track listing
Wonder (Single Version) - 4:24
Carnival - 5:59
Jealousy (Single Version) - 2:44
San Andreas Fault - 3:58
Kind & Generous - 4:06
Break Your Heart - 4:53
Life is Sweet - 5:14
The Living - 3:18
Build a Levee - 4:48
Not in This Life - 5:22
Motherland - 4:45
Owensboro - 4:25
Sally Ann - 5:49

A Special Deluxe Edition of Retrospective: 1990-2005 was available for a limited time from Natalie Merchant's website.  This version included a second disc with B-sides and rarities:

She Devil (outtake from Ophelia) - 5:55
Cowboy Romance (outtake from The House Carpenter's Daughter) - 8:02
Children Go Where I Send Thee - 5:12
Birds and Ships (with Billy Bragg) - 2:13
The Lowlands of Holland (with The Chieftains) - 3:49
One Fine Day (from the movie One Fine Day) - 2:47
Photograph (with R.E.M.) - 3:32
Party of God (with Billy Bragg) - 4:17
Thick as Thieves (Acoustic Version) - 6:23
Bread and Circuses (with Billy Bragg) - 4:24
Because I Could Not Stop for Death (with Susan McKeown) - 3:50
Tell Yourself (Acoustic Version) - 5:05
But Not for Me - 3:26
I Know How to Do It - 4:26
Come Take a Trip in My Airship - 4:03

Natalie Merchant albums
B-side compilation albums
2005 greatest hits albums
Elektra Records compilation albums